Lynn A. Baker is an American World Champion bridge player and legal academic. She has won 14 North American Bridge Championships and won two World Championships.
Professor Baker teaches law at the University of Texas in Austin.

Baker became a world champion and a World Women Grand Master at the World Bridge Federation (WBF) meet in October 2014 when her team won the quadrennial McConnell Cup. Team Baker won in a field of 26 women . She played with Karen McCallum of the United States and their teammates were Nicola Smith–Sally Brock of England and Marion Michielsen–Meike Wortel of the Netherlands.

Bridge accomplishments

Wins
 World Bridge Series Womens Teams (2) 2014, 2018 
 North American Bridge Championships (14)
 Smith Life Master Women's Pairs (2) 2003, 2007 
 Machlin Women's Swiss Teams (3) 1998, 2001, 2007 
 Wagar Women's Knockout Teams (4) 2003, 2005, 2008, 2010 
 Sternberg Women's Board-a-Match Teams (4) 1999, 2005, 2006, 2008 
 Chicago Mixed Board-a-Match (1) 1999

Runners-up

 Venice Cup (1) 2009 
 North American Bridge Championships
 Machlin Women's Swiss Teams (2) 1999, 2008 
 Wagar Women's Knockout Teams (1) 2014 
 Sternberg Women's Board-a-Match Teams (1) 2002

References

External links
 
 

American contract bridge players
Venice Cup players
American legal scholars
Living people
Year of birth missing (living people)
Place of birth missing (living people)